The Halifax Range is a small mountain range on Vancouver Island, British Columbia, Canada, adjacent to Johnstone Strait, between Amor de Cosmos Creek and Pye Creek. It consists of hills and has an area of 51 km2 and is a subrange of the Vancouver Island Ranges which in turn form part of the Insular Mountains.

See also
List of mountain ranges

References

Vancouver Island Ranges